The Mid-Eastern Wrestling Federation (MEWF) Cruiserweight Championship was the primary Cruiserweight singles title in the Mid-Eastern Wrestling Federation.

The title was created when Ricky Blues defeated Adrian Hall at an event held in Pasadena, Maryland on October 11, 1991. It was originally known as the MEWF Light Heavyweight Championship, then renamed the MEWF Maryland State Championship in 2001. In 2003, the title was merged with the MCW Cruiserweight Championship when Maryland Championship Wrestling held its final show as an interpromtional event with the Mid-Eastern Wrestling Federation creating the Mid-Eastern Wrestling Federation Unified Cruiserweight Championship on July 16, 2003.

The championship has been known as:
MEWF Light Heavyweight Championship (1991 – 2000) 
MEWF Maryland State Championship (2000 – 2002) 
MEWF Cruiserweight Championship (2002 – 2003) 
MEWF Unified Cruiserweight Championship (2003 – 2004)

There have been a total of 27 recognized champions who have had a combined 35 official reigns.

Title history

MEWF Light Heavyweight Championship

MEWF Maryland State Championship

MEWF Cruiserweight Championship

References

Cruiserweight wrestling championships